The 2016 National Football Challenge Cup or 2016 Pakistan Football Federation Cup was the 26th season of domestic cup tournament in Pakistani football. 24 teams took part in this competition from 28 January 2016 to 22 February 2016, which took place in Islamabad, Lahore, and Karachi. 

Khan Research Laboratories were the defending champions. They defended their title after defeating National Bank 1–0 in the final.

Renaming
The National Challenge Cup was renamed to Pakistan Football Federation Cup or PFF Cup for unknown reasons. After eight months of no football action, the tournament was announced for 28 January 2016 to 23 February 2016.

Format

Qualifying round
For qualification, 15 teams from PFF League (B Division) and 1 team from the Pakistan Premier League played in a group stage, with winners and runners-up from each group qualifying for the final round.

Final round
Eight teams from the qualifying round and eight teams from the Pakistan Premier League played in a group stage, with the group winners and runners-up qualifying for the knock-out stages.

Teams

Qualifying round

Group I

All Matches played in Karachi

Group II

All Matches played in Karachi

Group III

All Matches played in Lahore

Group IV

All Matches played in Islamabad

Group stage

Group A

Group B

Group C

Group D

Quarterfinals

Semifinals

Third place match

Final

Knockout round

Bracket

Top scorer

Prize fund
Prize money for 2016 PFF Cup.Teams

Fair Play, Best Players and Referees

References

Football competitions in Pakistan
Pakistan
Pakistan National Football Challenge Cup
2016 in Pakistani sport
2010s in Pakistani sport
2010s in Pakistan
Sports competitions in Islamabad
Sport in Lahore
Sport in Karachi
2010s in Islamabad
2010s in Lahore
2010s in Karachi